This list of existing technologies predicted in science fiction includes every medium, mainly literature and film. In 1964 Soviet engineer and writer Genrikh Altshuller made the first attempt to catalogue science fiction technologies of the time. 

Alongside first prediction of a particular technology, the list may include all subsequent works mentioning it until its invention. The list includes technologies that were first posited in non-fiction works before their appearance in science fiction and subsequent invention, such as ion thruster. To avoid repetitions, the list excludes film adaptations of prior literature containing the same predictions, such as "The Minority Report". The list also excludes emerging technologies that are not widely available. The titles of non-English works are given in English. The names of some modern inventions (atomic bomb, credit card, robot, space station and borazon) exactly match their fictional predecessors. A few works correctly predicted the years when some technologies would emerge, such as the first sustained heavier-than-air aircraft flight in 1903 and the first atomic bomb explosion in 1945.

Literature
{| class="wikitable sortable"
|-
! Work
! Author(s)
! Publication year
! Predicted technology
! Name(s) in the work
|-
| Comical History of the States and Empires of the Moon
| 
| 1657
| Space rocket
| Machine
|-
|The Blazing World
|   
| 1666
| Submarine
| Ships that could swim under water
|-
| Giphantie
| 
| 1761
| Photography
| Unnamed, descriptive
|-
| Symzonia: A Voyage of Discovery
| 
| 1820
| Jet engine
| Unnamed, descriptive
|-
| Probable Tall Tales
|   
| 1824
| Aviation, printer, Kingston valve 
| Aerial stagecoaches (for aviation), writing machines (for printers), openings with valves for letting water into a special bulkhead in the hold (for Kingston valves)
|-
| The United Worlds, a Poem, in Fifty Seven Books
|  
| 1834
| Android
| Androides
|-
| The Year 4338: Petersburg Letters
| 
| 1835
| Rapid transit (subway), electric multiple unit, aviation
| Electric carriage (for electric multiple unit), galvanic flying machine (for aviation)
|-
| The Air Battle; A Vision of the Future
| 
| 1859
| Remote control devices
|
|-
| From the Earth to the Moon
|   
| 1865
| Solar sail, splashdown
| Both unnamed, descriptive
|-
| The Brick Moon
| 
| 1869
| Space station
| Brick moon
|-
| Twenty Thousand Leagues Under the Sea
|   
| 1870
| Electric submarine, gas-discharge lamp, taser
| Submarine Nautilus, Ruhmkorff apparatus, gun
|-
| "The Great Electric Diaphragm. Some Account of the Telegraphic System of the Baron O---"
| 
| 1879
| Radio
| 
|-
| "The Senator's Daughter"
| 
| 1879
| Electric heating
| Thermo-electrode 
|-
| Mizora
| 
| 1880
| Synthetic meat
| Chemically prepared meat
|-
| Robur the Conqueror
|   
| 1886
| Autogyro, helicopter
| Flying engine Albatross
|-
| Looking Backward
|   
| 1888
| Credit card and debit card
| Credit card
|-
| "In the Year 2889"
|  or 
| 1889
| News broadcasting, videotelephony
| Phonotelephote (for videotelephony)
|-
| Electric Life 
| 
| 1891
| Television, videotelephony, aviation, biological weapons, miniskirt
| Telephonoscope (for television), aeronefs-omnibus (for aviation)
|-
| Six Thousand Years Hence
| 
| 1891
| Machine translation
|
|-
| "The Great Brown–Pericord Motor"
|   
| 1891
| Heavier-than-air unmanned aerial vehicle (drone)
| Brown–Pericord Motor
|-
| The Angel of the Revolution
| 
| 1893
| Air-to-surface missile, heavier-than-air aircraft flight  
| Missile boring its way through the air for the centre of the fortress, air-ship Ariel
|-
| A Journey in Other Worlds
| 
| 1894
| International telephone network, videotelephony, hidden camera, phosphorescent paint, radar speed gun, chemical weapon
| Descriptive for telephone network, kintograph or visual telegraph for videotelephony, strips of nickel painted white, and showing a bright phosphorescence at night (for phosphorescent paint), asphyxiating bombs containing compressed gas that could be fired from guns or dropped from the air (for chemical weapons)
|-
| Propeller Island
| 
| 1895
| Audiobook
|
|-
| The Crack of Doom
| 
| 1895
| Atomic bomb or hydrogen bomb 
| Disintegrating agent 
|-
| The Island of Dr. Moreau
| 
| 1896
| Organ transplantation
| Unnamed, descriptive
|-
| The War of the Worlds
| 
| 1898
| Laser, chemical weapon
| Heat-ray (for laser), black and poisonous vapour by means of rockets (for chemical weapon)
|-
| When the Sleeper Wakes
| 
| 1899
| Military aviation, automatic door
| Aeroplanes (for military aircraft)
|-
| "The Imp of the Telephone"
| 
| 1902
| Videocassette recorder
|
|-
| "The Land Ironclads"
| 
| 1903
| Armoured fighting vehicles, joystick with firing button
| Land ironclads
|-
| "Sultana's Dream"
| 
| 1905
| Solar power, seasonal thermal energy storage
| Unnamed, descriptive
|-
| "With the Night Mail"
| 
| 1905
| Airmail by airplanes
|
|-
| The Last Miracle
| 
| 1907
| Hologram
| 
|-
| Red Star
|    
| 1908
| Nuclear engine, automated plant
| Etheroneph (for nuclear engine)
|-
| The War in the Air
| 
| 1908
| Military aviation
| Fleet of airships
|-
| A Columbus of Space
| 
| 1909
| Nuclear-powered spaceship
| Atomic balloon
|-
| "The Machine Stops"
| 
| 1909
| Home automation (smart home), television, videotelephony, social media
| Cinematophote (for television)
|-
| The Emperor of the Air
| 
| 1910
| Wankel engine
|
|-
| "He of the Glass Heart"
| 
| 1911
| Artificial human heart
|
|-
| Ralph 124C 41+
| 
| 1911
| Solar power, television, tape recorder, sound film, videotelephony, radar and spaceflight
| Telephot (for videotelephony), actinoscope (for radar)
|-
| The Great Aeroplane. A Thrilling Tale of Adventure
| 
| 1911
| Jet propulsion
|
|-
| The World Set Free
|   
| 1914
| Atomic bomb, nuclear propulsion
| Atomic bomb, atomic engine
|-
| Beyond the Earth
|  
| 1920
| Artificial gravity, lunar rover
| Artificial gravity
|-
| R.U.R.
| 
| 1920
| Robots
| Robots
|-
| "The Devolutionist"
| 
| 1921
| Artificial human heart
|
|-
| "The Secret of Artificial Reproduction"
| 
| 1921
| Cloning
|
|-
| "Number 87"
| 
| 1922
| Discovery of francium
|
|-
| The Absolute at Large
| 
| 1922
| Nuclear reactor
| Karburator
|-
| Men Like Gods
|  
| 1923
| Email, voicemail
| Unnamed, descriptive
|-
| We
|  	 
| 1924
| Interstellar message, specifically Voyager Golden Record
| Unnamed, descriptive
|-
| Metropolis
| 
| 1925
| Robots
| Machines
|-
| In a Thousand Years
| 
| 1926
| Atomic bomb explosion in 1945 (Trinity test) 
| Atomic explosion of 1945
|-
| The Garin Death Ray
| 
| 1927
| Laser
| Hyperboloid
|-
| Amphibian Man
| 
| 1928
| Aqua-Lung
| Underwater suits with oxygen tanks
|-
| The Struggle in Space
| 
| 1928
| Mobile phone
| Wireless telephone
|-
| Electropolis
| 
| 1928
| Microwave oven, Global Positioning System (GPS)
|
|-
| "Evans of the Earth-Guard"
| 
| 1930
| Vernier thruster
| Rocket’s side tubes 
|-
| Paradise and Iron
| 
| 1930
| Home automation, self-driving car
|
|-
| "The Black Star Passes"
|   
| 1930
| Solar-powered aircraft
| Solar engine, one that could be placed in the wings of a plane to generate power
|-
| "The Message From Space"
| 
| 1930
| Videotelephony
| Visiphone
|-
| Underwater Farmers
| 
| 1930
| Diver propulsion vehicle
|
|-
| Brave New World
| 
| 1932
| 4D film
| Feelies, works of art out of practically nothing but pure sensation
|-
| "Pygmalion's Spectacles"
| 
| 1935
| Smartglasses, virtual reality
| Magic spectacles (for smartglasses)
|-
| The Star KETS
| 
| 1936
| Space station, extravehicular activity, satellite
|
|-
| "Sugar in the Air"
| 
| 1937
| Artificial photosynthesis
|
|-
| "Helen O'Loy"
| 
| 1938
| Domestic robot
| Helen O'Loy
|-
| "Blowups Happen"
| 
| 1940
| Nuclear power plant
|
|-
| "Coventry"
| 
| 1940
| Solar vehicle
| Vehicle with "sunpower screens"
|-
| "Solution Unsatisfactory"
| 
| 1941
| Atomic bomb
| U235 in a controlled explosion, a one-ton bomb that would be a whole air raid in itself
|-
| "Nerves"
| 
| 1942
| Widespread nuclear power
|
|-
| "Waldo"
| 
| 1942
| Remote manipulator, robot-assisted surgery
| Waldo F. Jones' Synchronous Reduplicating Pantograph; later in acknowledgment some remote manipulators were dubbed "Waldos".
|-
| "Fakaofo Atoll"
| 
| 1944
| Underwater television
|
|-
| "Shadow of the Past"
| 
| 1945
| Hologram
| Light imprint
|-
| "A Logic Named Joe"
| 
| 1946
| Computer, Internet, server 
| Logic (for computer), tank (for server)
|-
| Space Cadet
| 
| 1948
| Mobile phone
|
|-
| "The Veldt"
| 
| 1950
| Home automation (smart home), 4D film, virtual reality
| Happylife Home (for smart home), odorophonics (for 4D film)
|-
| "There Will Come Soft Rains"
| 
| 1950
| Robotic vacuum cleaner
| Small cleaning animals, all rubber and metal
|-
| Foundation
| 
| 1951
| Pocket calculator
|
|-
| "Rock Diver" 
| 
| 1951 
| Helmet-mounted display
| Oscilloscope screen set inside helmet
|-
| "The Pedestrian"
| 
| 1951
| Self-driving car
| Police car
|-
| Islands in the Sky
| 
| 1952
| Space station
| Space Station, Inner Station
|-
| Childhood's End
| 
| 1953
| Oral contraceptive, DNA paternity testing
| Oral contraceptive, infallible method of identifying the father of any child
|-
| Fahrenheit 451
| 
| 1953
| Earphones (earbuds), flatscreen television, automated teller machine (ATM)
| Seashells (for earbuds), wall-TV (for flatscreen television), bank which was open all night and every night with robot tellers (for ATM)
|-
| The Caves of Steel
| 
| 1953
| Fingerprint scanner
| Unnamed, descriptive
|-
| The Star Beast
| 
| 1954
| Mobile phone
|
|-
| The Magellanic Cloud
| 
| 1955
| Internet, smartphone with internet access, additive manufacturing file format, 3D printing
| Trion (for internet), pocket receiver (for smartphone), production prescription (for additive manufacturing file format), the automaton (for 3D printer)
|-
| The City and the Stars
| 
| 1956
| Immersive virtual reality games
| Central computer, which virtually ran the city
|-
| The Door into Summer
| 
| 1956
| Automated teller machine (ATM), robotic vacuum cleaner, computer-aided design (CAD)
| Twenty-four-hour bank (for ATM), Hired Girl (for robotic vacuum cleaner), gismo (for CAD)
|-
| "The Minority Report"
| 
| 1956
| Facial recognition system, personalized ads
|-
| The Naked Sun
| 
| 1956
| Flatscreen 3D television, domestic robot
| Viewing panels, household robots
|-
| Andromeda: A Space-Age Tale
| 
| 1957
| Borazon, space probe, powered exoskeleton, ion thruster
| Borason, geological bomb, robot station (for space probe), jumping skeletons (for powered exoskeletons), ion trigger motors (for ion thrusters)
|-
| The Man Without Heart
|  ,  
| 1957
| Artificial human heart
|
|-
| "Prospector’s Special"
|   
| 1959
| Mobile phone, videotelephony
| Telephone, video screen
|-
| Return from the Stars
|  
| 1961
| E-reader, audiobook
| Opton (for e-reader), lecton (for audiobook)
|-
| "The Way You Will Be"
| 
| 1961
| 4D film
|
|-
| Razor's Edge
| 
| 1963
| Solar-pumped laser
|
|-
| The Age of the Pussyfoot
| 
| 1965
| Smartphone
| Joymaker
|-
| The Cyberiad
| 
| 1965
| Life simulation game
| 
|-
| The Final Circle of Paradise
| 
| 1965
| Paintball, self-driving car, Bluetooth headset
| Liapnik (for paintball)
|-
| The Moon Is a Harsh Mistress
| 
| 1966
| Voice user interface 
|
|-
| 2001: A Space Odyssey
| 
| 1968
| Voice user interface, tablet computer
| Newspad (for tablet computer)
|-
| Stand on Zanzibar
| 
| 1968
| On demand television, laser printer
|
|-
| "The Scarred Man"
| 
| 1970
| Computer virus
|
|-
| Cyborg
| 
| 1972
| Robotic prostheses
|
|-
| When HARLIE Was One
| 
| 1972
| Computer virus
|
|-
| Imperial Earth
| 
| 1975
| Personalized ads, search engine
| Personal messages (for personalized ads), Comsole (for search engine)
|-
| The Shockwave Rider
| 
| 1975
| Hacking, computer worm
|
|-
| One Hundred Years Ahead
| Kir Bulychev
| 1978
| E-reader, smartwatch
| 
|-
| The Hitchhiker's Guide to the Galaxy
| 
| 1979
| Audio translation device
| Babel fish
|- 
| "Burning Chrome"
| 
| 1982
| Internet
|
|-
| Friday
| 
| 1982
| Internet
|
|-
| The Descent of Anansi| , 
| 1982
| Tethered satellite 
|
|-
| Neuromancer| 
| 1984
| World Wide Web, virtual reality
|
|-
| Islands in the Net|   
| 1988
| Smart shoe
|
|-
| Paris in the Twentieth Century| 
| 1994
| Skyscrapers, gasoline-powered cars, electric street lights, electronic dance music, fax, internet, electric chair, weapons of mass destruction
|
|}

Film and TV series

 Notes 

References

Sources

See also
Clarke's three laws
List of emerging technologies
List of hypothetical technologies
Materials science in science fictionProphets of Science Fiction''

Prediction
existing technologies predicted in science fiction
existing technologies predicted in science fiction
existing technologies predicted in science fiction
History of technology